is a JR West Hakubi Line and Geibi Line station located on the west side of Niimi, Okayama Prefecture, Japan.

History
1936-10-10: The Nunohara signal box begins operation. Limited passenger service began in 1953.
1987-04-01: Japan National Railways was privatized, and Nunohara became an official JR West station at the same time.

Station layout
Nunohara Station has two platforms and can handle two rail lines. The Nishi River is located nearby. Because it is a rural station, only a small grouping of houses and buildings is found near Nunohara Station.

Connecting lines
All lines are JR West.
Hakubi Line
All trains bypass this station.
Geibi Line
Local: Niimi Station — Nunohara Station — Bitchū Kōjiro Station

External links

 JR West

Geibi Line
Hakubi Line
Railway stations in Okayama Prefecture
Railway stations in Japan opened in 1936